Jinggangshan Power Station,  also spelled Jinggangshan Power Plant, is a large thermal power project, located in Jinggangshan City, Jiangxi Province, China.

History
The construction of Jinggangshan Power Station started in November 1998, the first stage of construction of Jinggangshan Power Plant reached an installed capacity of 600,000 kilowatts, consisting of two 300,000-kilowatt coal-fired generating units.

Jinggangshan Power Station is a key project during China's "Ninth Five-Year Plan" period, with a total installed capacity of 1.92 million kilowatts and a total investment of 7.09 billion yuan.

In August 2001, the first phase of the project was officially put into operation. In December 2009, the second phase of the project was officially put into operation.

References 

2009 establishments in China
Energy infrastructure completed in 2009